The Comparative Study of Electoral Systems (CSES) is a collaborative research project among national election studies around the world.  Participating countries and polities include a common module of survey questions in their national post-election studies. The resulting data are collated together along with voting, demographic, district and macro variables into one dataset allowing comparative analysis of voting behavior from a multilevel perspective.

The CSES is published as a free, public dataset. The project is administered by the CSES Secretariat, a joint effort between the Institute for Social Research at the University of Michigan and the GESIS - Leibniz Institute for the Social Sciences in Germany.

Aims and content of the study 

The CSES project was founded in 1994 with two major aims. The first was to promote international collaboration between national election studies. The second was to allow researchers to study variations in political institutions, especially electoral systems, and their effects on individual attitudes and behaviors, especially turnout and vote choice.

CSES datasets contain variables at three levels.  The first is micro-level variables which are answered by respondents during post-election surveys in each included country.  The second is district-level variables that contain election results from the electoral districts that survey respondents are situated in.  The third is macro-level variables containing information about the country context and electoral system, as well as aggregate data such as economic indicators and democracy indices. This nested data structure, as depicted in Figure 1, allows for multilevel analysis.

A new thematic module is devised by the CSES Planning Committee every five years. Between the final releases of the complete modules, CSES also disseminates advance releases of datasets periodically, which include partial data for modules that have not been fully released yet.

Survey data collection for module 1 was conducted between 1996 and 2001 and focuses on system performance. The module allows investigation of the impact of electoral institutions on citizens’ political cognition and behavior as well as of the nature of political and social cleavages and alignment. Furthermore, it enables research about citizens’ evaluation of democratic institutions and processes. Module 1 includes 39 election studies conducted in 33 countries.

Survey data collection for module 2 was conducted between 2001 and 2006 and focuses on accountability and representation. It addresses the contrast between the view that elections are a mechanism to hold government accountable and the view that they are a means to ensure that citizens’ views and interests are properly represented in the democratic process. Module 2 includes 41 election studies conducted in 38 countries.

Survey data collection for module 3 was conducted between 2006 and 2011. The module allows investigating the meaningfulness of electoral choices and, accordingly, focuses on a major aspect of electoral research: the contingency in choice of available options. Module 3 includes 50 election studies conducted in 41 countries.

Survey data collection for module 4 was conducted between 2011 and 2016 and focuses on distributional politics and social protection. The main topics investigated are voters’ preferences for public policy and the mediating factors of political institutions and voting behavior.  Module 4 includes 45 election studies conducted in 39 countries.

Survey data collection for module 5 is conducted between 2016 and 2021 and focuses on the electorate's attitudes towards political elites, on the one hand, and towards "out groups", on the other hand. It thus enables research on attitudes and voting behavior in the context of a rise of parties campaigning on anti-establishment messages and in opposition to "out groups".

A complete table of all variables available across modules can be found on the CSES website.

CSES also has an Integrated Module Dataset (IMD) which brings together the existing Standalone CSES Modules  (CSES Modules 1–4 inclusive) into one longitudinal and harmonized dataset. Variables that appear in at least three Standalone CSES Modules, up to and including CSES Module 5, are eligible for inclusion in IMD with all polities participating in CSES included in the dataset.

CSES IMD includes over 281,000 individual-level observations across 174 elections in 55 polities, with voter evaluations of over 600 political parties. Highlights of the IMD file is party and coalition numerical codes are synchronized across CSES Modules and the incorporation of data bridging variables allowing CSES data to be easily merged with other common datasets in the social sciences. CSES IMD launched in December 2018 and is being rolled out on a phased basis with the latest release, Phase 3 released in December 2020.

Countries in the study 

A frequently updated election study table across all modules can be found on the CSES website.

Data access 

CSES data are available publicly and are free of charge. Data releases are non-proprietary – in other words the data are made available to the public without preferential or advance access to anyone. Data is available in multiple formats including for common statistical packages like STATA, SPSS, SAS and R. The data can be downloaded from the CSES website as well as via the GESIS data catalogue. The GESIS online analysis tool ZACAT can furthermore be used to browse and explore the dataset.

Organizational structure and funding

The CSES Secretariat

In conjunction with national election study collaborators, the CSES Secretariat administers the CSES project. It consists of staff from the GESIS - Leibniz Institute for the Social Sciences in Germany and the University of Michigan, Ann-Arbor in the United States. The Secretariat is responsible for compiling the final CSES dataset by harmonizing the single country studies into a cross-national dataset. It is also responsible for collecting the district and macro data, for data documentation, and for ensuring data quality. The Secretariat, furthermore, maintains the CSES website, promotes the project, provides support to the user community, and organizes conferences and project meetings.

The Planning Committee, collaborators and the CSES Plenary

The CSES research agenda, study design, and questionnaires are developed by an international committee of leading scholars in political science, sociology, and survey methodology. This committee is known as the CSES Planning Committee. At the beginning of each new module, a new Planning Committee is established. Nominations for the Planning Committee come from the user community, with membership of the Committee then being approved by the CSES Plenary Meeting. The Plenary Meeting is made up of national collaborators from each national election study involved in the CSES. Ideas for new modules can be submitted by anyone. More information on the current planning committee, its members, and subcommittee reports, as well as on past Planning Committees can be found on the CSES website. A list of country collaborators who participate in CSES can also be found on the CSES website.

Funding and support

The work of the CSES Secretariat is funded by the American National Science Foundation, the GESIS - Leibniz Institute for the Social Sciences and the University of Michigan’s Center for Political Studies along with in-kind support from participating election studies, additional organizations that sponsor planning meetings and conferences, and the many organizations that fund election studies by CSES collaborators.

Klingemann Prize

Each year, the CSES awards the GESIS Klingemann Prize for the best CSES scholarship (paper, book, dissertation, or other scholarly work, broadly defined). The award is sponsored by the GESIS - Leibniz Institute for the Social Sciences and is named in honor of Professor Dr. Hans-Dieter Klingemann, co-founder of the CSES, an internationally renowned political scientist who made significant contributions to cross-national electoral research. Nominated works must make extensive use of CSES and have a publication date in the calendar year prior to the award, either in print or online.

Winners of the Klingemann Prize

2022: Vicente Valentim (University of Oxford) (2021): Parliamentary representation and the normalization of radical right support. Comparative political studies, 54(14), 2475-2511. doi:10.1177/0010414021997159

2021: Enrique Hernández (Universitat Autònoma de Barcelona), Eva Anduiza (Universitat Autònoma de Barcelona) und Guillem Rico (Universitat Autònoma de Barcelona) (2021): Affective polarization and the salience of elections. Electoral Studies, 69(1), 1-9. https://doi.org/10.1016/j.electstud.2020.102203

2020: Eelco Harteveld (University of Amsterdam), Stefan Dahlberg (University of Gothenburg), Andrej Kokkonen (Aarhus University) and Wouter Van Der Brug (University of Amsterdam) (2019). “Gender Differences in Vote Choice: Social Cues and Social Harmony as Heuristics”. British Journal of Political Science, 49(3), 1141-1161. doi:10.1017/S0007123417000138

2019: Ruth Dassonneville (University of Montreal) and Ian McAllister (Australian National University) (2018). "Gender, Political Knowledge, and Descriptive Representation: The Impact of Long-Term Socialization". American Journal of Political Science, 62(2), 249-265. doi:10.1111/ajps.12353

2018: André Blais (University of Montreal), Eric Guntermann (University of Montreal) and Marc-André Bodet (University of Laval) (2017). "Linking Party Preferences and the Composition of Government: A New Standard for Evaluating the Performance of Electoral Democracy". Political Science Research and Methods, 5(2), 315–331. doi:10.1017/psrm.2015.78

2017: Dani Marinova (Autonomous University of Barcelona) (2016). "Coping with Complexity: How Voters Adapt to Unstable Parties". ECPR Press.

2016: Kasara Kimuli (Columbia University) and Pavithra Suryanarayan (Johns Hopkins University) (2015). "When Do the Rich Vote Less Than the Poor and Why? Explaining Turnout Inequality across the World". American Journal of Political Science, 59(3), 613-627. doi:10.1111/ajps.12134

2015: Noam Lupu (University of Wisconsin-Madison) (2015). "Party Polarization and Mass Partisanship: A Comparative Perspective". Political Behavior, 37(2), 331-356. doi:10.1007/s11109-014-9279-z

2014: Richard R. Lau (Rutgers University), Parina Patel (Georgetown University), Dalia F. Fahmy (Long Island University) and Robert R. Kaufman (Rutgers University) (2014). "Correct Voting Across Thirty-Three Democracies: A Preliminary Analysis". British Journal of Political Science, 44(02), 239-259. doi:10.1017/S0007123412000610

2013: Mark Andreas Kayser (Hertie School of Governance) and Michael Peress (University of Rochester) (2012). "Benchmarking across Borders: Electoral Accountability and the Necessity of Comparison". American Political Science Review, 106(03), 661-684. doi:10.1017/S0003055412000275

2012: Russell J. Dalton (University of California, Irvine) David M. Farrell (University College Dublin) and Ian McAllister (Australian National University) (2011). "Political Parties and Democratic Linkage. How Parties Organize Democracy". Oxford University Press.

2011: Matt Golder (Florida State University) and  Jacek Stramski (Florida State University) (2011). "Ideological Congruence and Electoral Institutions". American Journal of Political Science, 54(1), 90-106. doi:10.1111/j.1540-5907.2009.00420.x

Further resources

More information about the CSES can be obtained from the CSES website. CSES also maintains an active social media presence on Twitter (@csestweets) and on Facebook. The project maintains a blog which provides a glimpse into the work of the CSES project and its associated scholars and user community. The CSES Blog presents research using CSES data, introduces election study collaborators from around the world, offers updates on data collection from the field and provides updates about the CSES and comparative political science research more generally.

CSES Bibliography

The CSES Bibliography cites scholarly publications and presentations known to utilize the CSES.

References

External links
 Comparative Study of Electoral Systems
 CSES at GESIS – Leibniz-Institute for the Social Sciences 
 CSES Blog

Political science
Social research
Social statistics data
Statistical data sets